Arnaud Émile Benoît Huygues des Etages (born 30 December 1985) is a Martiniquais professional footballer who plays as a goalkeeper for the club Aiglon du Lamentin, and the Martinique national team.

International career
Huygues des Etages debuted with the Martinique national team in a 1–0 CONCACAF Nations League loss to Honduras on 13 October 2019. He was called up to represent Martinique at the 2021 CONCACAF Gold Cup.

References

External links
 

1985 births
Living people
Sportspeople from Fort-de-France
Martiniquais footballers
Martinique international footballers
Association football goalkeepers
2021 CONCACAF Gold Cup players